At Bay is a 1915 American silent drama film directed by George Fitzmaurice and starring Florence Reed. It is based on a 1913 Broadway play, At Bay, by George Scarborough and produced by the Shuberts. On stage, Reed's starring part was played by Chrystal Herne. The film is lost.

Plot

Cast
Florence Reed as Aline Graham
Frank Sheridan as District Attorney Graham
Lyster Chambers as Joe Hunter
DeWitt Jennings as Judson Flagg
Charles Waldron as Captain Holbrook
Richard Taber
Raymond Hatton as Unknown unaccredited role

References

External links

1915 films
American silent feature films
Lost American films
Films directed by George Fitzmaurice
American black-and-white films
Silent American drama films
1915 drama films
Films with screenplays by Ouida Bergère
Pathé Exchange films
1915 lost films
1910s American films